The Macintosh Quadra 800 (also sold with bundled server software as the Apple Workgroup Server 80) is a personal computer that is a part of Apple Computer's Quadra series of Macintosh computers.

Introduced in February 1993 alongside the first Macintosh Centris models, it was the first totally new Quadra model since the original Quadras, the 700 and the 900 / 950. It was positioned below the 950 (and the previous midrange Quadra, the 700, was discontinued shortly after the 800's introduction). Debuting at half the price of the 950, the 800 featured the same Motorola 68040 33 MHz processor as the 950 but its additional interleaved RAM running at 70 ns, as well as an enhanced video system and SCSI bus, enabled it to outperform the 950. However, its tower case was smaller and much less accessible, giving it the reputation of being one of Apple's worst cases of all time. The Quadra 800 was later joined by the multimedia-focused Quadra 840AV.

The Quadra 800 was discontinued in March 1994 in favor of the PowerPC-based Power Macintosh 8100. Both the 8100 and its successor, the Power Macintosh 8500, used the Quadra 800 case, as did the European version of the Power Macintosh 7200 (marketed as the Power Macintosh 8200). A taller, highly modified variant of the case was also used for the Power Macintosh 9500.

Hardware 
Case: Apple introduced a new mini-tower case design for the Quadra 800, which was subsequently used for the Quadra 840AV, Power Macintosh 8100, 8200 and 8500.  Infoworld's review of the Quadra 800 described the case's design as follows: "Apple recommends that you take your machine into an authorized dealer to install additional memory. It’s no wonder — the procedure is fraught with difficulties (although not as bad as previous compact models such as the SE). In order to access the SIMM slots, you need to detach the logic board from its plastic holders (which are easily broken). You then flip the board over to access the slots. If you have any boards in the machine, you need to remove them. And when you try to put it all back together, you may find some of your internal SCSI connections have come loose."

Video: The logic board has 512 KB of on-board VRAM; this is sufficient to provide 256-color (8-bit) support on monitors up to 16 inches in size.  Two VRAM SIMM slots provide the ability to upgrade to 1 MB of VRAM, which allows for 32,768 color (16-bit) resolutions. The Quadra 800 is not capable of operating at 24-bit color, regardless of how much VRAM is installed, or whether an external video card is used. David Pogue described this as "Apple deliberately crippling this machine to enhance the attractiveness of the Quadra 900 and 950 models."

CD-ROM: Some configurations included an AppleCD 300i 2x CD-ROM.  The Quadra 800 was one of the first Macintoshes shipped with a bootable CD-ROM.

Models 
All configurations include an external SCSI port, two ADB and two serial ports, 3 NuBus slots, a Processor Direct Slot, mono audio in, and stereo audio out.  The inclusion of an AAUI Ethernet port varied by region.  The newly-introduced Apple Desktop Bus Mouse II was included with all configurations.

Introduced February 10, 1993:
 Macintosh Quadra 800: Sold in multiple configurations.
 8 MB RAM (onboard), 512 KB VRAM (onboard), no HDD
 8 MB RAM (onboard), 512 KB VRAM (onboard), 230 MB HDD. US$4,679.
 8 MB RAM (onboard), 512 KB VRAM (onboard), 500 MB HDD
 24 MB RAM (8 MB onboard + 16 MB SIMM), 1 MB VRAM (512 KB onboard + 512 KB SIMM), 1 GB HDD

Introduced March 22, 1993:
 Workgroup Server 80

Timelines

References

External links 

 Quadra 800 at Low End Mac
 Quadra 800 and Workgroup Server 80 at EveryMac.com

800
Quadra 800
Quadra 800
Quadra 800
Quadra 800
Computer-related introductions in 1993

de:Macintosh Quadra